The Colorado International is a tournament for female professional tennis players played on outdoor hard courts. The event is classified as a 50K ITF Women's Circuit Tournament. It is held in Denver, United States, since 2012.

Past finals

Singles

Doubles

External links
ITF search
Official Website

ITF Women's World Tennis Tour
Hard court tennis tournaments in the United States
Defunct tennis tournaments in the United States
Tennis in Colorado